Epidesma obliqua is a moth of the subfamily Arctiinae. It was described by William Schaus in 1898. It is found in Rio de Janeiro, Brazil.

References

Epidesma
Moths described in 1898